Health Communication is a peer-reviewed academic journal covering health communication. It was established in 1989 and is published eight times per year by Taylor & Francis. The editor-in-chief is Teresa L. Thompson (University of Dayton). According to the Journal Citation Reports, the journal has a 2016 impact factor of 1.464, ranking it 26th out of 79 journals in the category "Communication" and 43rd out of 77 journals in the category "Health Policy & Services".

References

External links

Communication journals
Health policy journals
Taylor & Francis academic journals
Publications established in 1989
English-language journals
Health communication